The following are the national records in track cycling in Dominican Republic maintained by its national cycling federation: Federación Dominicana de Ciclismo.

Men

Women

References

External links
 Federación Dominicana de Ciclismo web site

Dominica
Records
Track cycling
Track cycling